Guillermo Durán and Máximo González were the defending champions, but González chose to participate at Shenzhen instead. Durán partnered with Guido Andreozzi and won the title by defeating Facundo Bagnis and Diego Schwartzman 6–3, 6–3 in the final.

Seeds

Draw

Draw

References
 Main Draw

2014 ATP Challenger Tour
2014 Doubles
2014 in Brazilian sport